DI Alexandra "Alex" Drake is a fictional character in BBC One's science fiction/police procedural drama Ashes to Ashes. The character is portrayed by Keeley Hawes and as a child by Lucy Cole.

Character history
The character of Alex Drake is the main protagonist of Ashes to Ashes, the sequel to the 2006 series Life on Mars, which followed the story of Sam Tyler (John Simm) who wakes in 1973 after being hit by a car in 2006. Ashes to Ashes follows the similar storyline of Alex Drake who after being shot in 2008 awakens in 1981. The character has been described as "ballsy, confident and bright", along with being "perceptive in deduction" and "understanding the workings of the criminal mind".

Ashes to Ashes

2008

During the first episode of Ashes to Ashes, it is revealed that Alex Drake is the unnamed police psychologist mentioned in the finale of Life on Mars, who interviewed and recorded case notes of Sam Tyler's time in 1973 and studied his subsequent suicide, as witnessed in the finale of Life on Mars.

During the opening scenes of the first episode, Drake, while driving her daughter Molly (Grace Vance) to school is unexpectedly called to a hostage situation near the embankment of the River Thames. Upon arriving, she is informed that the hostage taker, Arthur Layton (Sean Harris) is demanding to speak to her, despite Drake having no knowledge of him. Drake eventually negotiates the release of the civilian hostage in favour of herself. This prompts Drake's frightened daughter, Molly to rush past the cordon into the middle of the situation. Arthur Layton takes hold of Molly and rushes down the steps to the river's edge, followed by Drake shortly after to find her daughter unharmed with Layton missing. Upon returning to her car she fails to notice Layton in the back, who forces her at gunpoint to a disused barge and tells her that he knew her parents who died in 1981, Tim (Andrew Clover) and Caroline Price (Amelia Bullmore). Shortly after, Layton shoots Drake in the head.

Series 1
Following the shooting, Drake finds herself in 1981 less than fourteen weeks before the death of her parents, Tim and Caroline Price. Upon waking, she finds herself in the same location - on the barge which is host to a party.

From studying Sam Tyler's notes, Drake is familiar with Gene Hunt (Philip Glenister), Ray Carling (Dean Andrews) and Chris Skelton (Marshall Lancaster), and is so surprised to learn they actually exist, that she faints upon first seeing Hunt. After shocking the unit with the revelation she is the DI of the squad, Drake learns that Hunt, Carling and Skelton transferred to London following the death of Sam Tyler a year previously. Drake initially believes that she has assimilated Tyler's notes to create this world, and addresses her new colleagues as if they are not real. As well as this, Drake uses a dictaphone to record her experiences and frequently searches for radio communications and television images for information about her, knowing that Sam Tyler received information this way.

As the first series progresses, Drake comes to believe that she has been sent back to 1981 in order to save her parents from death. Along with this, Drake is constantly haunted by hallucinations of "The Clown". Eventually, it is revealed that her father Tim is the clown and that he arranged to blow himself up along with his wife, Caroline, and daughter, Alex, by hiring Arthur Layton to rig a car bomb after finding that Caroline was having an affair with Evan White (Stephen Campbell Moore).

Series 2
By the second series (set in 1982) Alex Drake is shown to have become more at ease with her life in the 1980s, and that her relationship with Gene Hunt has improved to the point where they work separately from the rest of the team and conduct unofficial investigations. In the first episode of the series, Drake is attacked by an unknown man who attempts to interrogate her about this world. After this incident, she realises she is being stalked by the same, who later is revealed to be Martin Summers (Gwilym Lee and Adrian Dunbar) who claims to be able to help her return to the present day.

Coinciding with the Martin Summers plot, the main storyline witnesses Drake and Hunt working together in order to uncover corruption within Fenchurch East CID. After several discoveries and unofficial investigations led by Hunt and Drake, it is revealed that their superior officer, Charlie Mackintosh (Roger Allam) is heavily involved in the web of corruption. During episode four, Mackintosh kills himself and shortly before dying warns Drake and Hunt of "Operation Rose", but is unable to reveal more detail. Shortly afterwards, Drake becomes aware that the 1982 younger version of Martin Summers is working in Fenchurch East Police Station. The older Summers arranges a meeting with both Drake and the 1982 Summers, leading to the older Summers shooting the younger. The older Summers forces the firearm used into Drake's hand to incriminate her, prompting Drake to dispose of both the body and firearm in cement.

Towards the end of the series, it is revealed that Operation Rose is the unofficial codename and call-sign for a gold bullion robbery masterminded by a web of corrupt police officers, involving the older version of Martin Summers, who returned to 1982 as his younger self stood by when the robbery happened in the real world. During the series finale, Hunt shoots and kills the older version of Summers and goes on to accidentally shoot Alex Drake. Upon waking in the present day, Drake observes Hunt screaming at her to wake up from her comatose state in 1982 through hospital monitor screens. It is then made clear that Martin Summers was a comatose patient a few rooms away from Alex Drake in the same hospital, explaining his ability to hear discussions about Alex's condition.

Series 3
During the first episode, Drake finds herself back in the present day. Along with talking to a therapist about her dreams of Hunt heroically chasing criminals in his Audi Quattro, to the sound of "Ride of the Valkyries", she observes Sharon Granger, Chris Skelton, Ray Carling and Gene Hunt visit her in hospital and ask her for help in differing forms through television screens. She re-awakens in 1983, with Hunt slapping her to bring her out of her coma in order to help clear his name.

Following her return to the 1980s, Hunt explains that after his accidental shooting of her he was accused of attempted murder and fled to the Isle of Wight and the Costa del Sol for a period of three months.

During the series, Drake is haunted by visions of a police officer with severe exit wounds to the left side of his face. Speculating that this relates to Sam Tyler, she tries to discover the truth about his death. Evidence and hints from the ghost and DCI Keats increasingly point to Gene having a hand in the incident. Although she begins to have more romantic feelings towards Hunt, his reluctance to tell her the truth leaves Drake wondering if he murdered Tyler.

In the finale, Drake follows clues from the ghost and Keats to a shallow grave in rural Lancashire, where she believes Sam to be buried. However, the body is that of the dead police officer haunting Drake, and is identified as a young Gene Hunt. Drake learns that she is trapped in a purgatory where Gene is a guide or male Valkyrie for dead police officers, while Keats is a demon tempting them to hell. Drake finally accepts that she died of her injuries, near the beginning of the first episode of season 3, at 9:06, concurrent with Gene's slap to her and her return to 1983, never having woken up from her coma; and would not be returning to her daughter in 2008. She bids a sad farewell to Gene as she passes on to the Railway Arms pub (a police analogue to Valhalla) with Ray, Chris, and Shaz.

Reality of 1980s
Alex is initially portrayed as convinced that her experiences in the 1980s are fantasy, being played out in her mind during the final seconds of her life after being shot. In the early episodes of the first series, Drake addresses her colleagues as "imaginary constructs" and mimes air quotes when saying their names.

After her parents were blown up in a carbombing, Drake remembers someone taking her hand as a little girl. Drake always assumed the hand belonged to Evan White, but once she went back to 1981 and witnessed her parents' death she observes it was Hunt who took her hand. This causes her to question whether Hunt is in fact a real person.

The series 3 finale explains that the 'Gene Hunt world' is in fact a purgatory for police officers with the Railway Arms pub acting as a 'gateway' to heaven.

References

External links
 Alex Drake (Ashes to Ashes)
 Alex Drake (BBC Press Office)
 Alex Drake (Daily Mirror newspaper)

Ashes to Ashes (TV series) characters
Fictional English people
Fictional British police detectives
Fictional psychologists
Television characters introduced in 2008